Chelwood Gate is a small village within the civil parish of Danehill in the Wealden district of East Sussex, England. The village is near the West Sussex border.

Chelwood Gate was one of the entrances into Ashdown Forest through which John of Gaunt, the third surviving son of King Edward III, would have entered the forest from his hunting lodge. There is an Iron Age enclosure which is a Scheduled Monument due to its importance as a relatively rare example of a Wealden Iron Age settlement.

The village church forms part of the Parish of All Saints Danehill with Chelwood Gate. The church was built as a 'Chapel of Ease' not long after the main parish building in Danehill was completed so that the residents local to Chelwood Gate would not have to travel the longer journey on foot to the church at Danehill.

The village public house, the Red Lion, was built in the 19th century and was patronised in the past by Harold Macmillan and United States President John F Kennedy. Kennedy came to visit the then Prime Minister, Harold Macmillan, in 1963 and a memorial to this event can be found on the Wych Cross road within the village. The village also has a village hall which is visited by a mobile library service, a village market and where there is also a nursery school.

Notable people
Henry Edger (1820-1888) was born here.
Harold Macmillan, prime minister of the United Kingdom from 1957 to 1963, was living in the village at the time of his death in December 1986 at the age of 92. Birch Grove, the Macmillan family home, was started in 1923 and completed in 1926 by Harold's father - who was the head of the Macmillan family publishing firm.

References 

Villages in East Sussex
Danehill, East Sussex